Bagolino is a comune in the province of Brescia, in Lombardy, Italy, in the valley of the river Caffaro, on the right side of Valle Sabbia. Bagolino is known for the cheese named Bagòss and the carnival. Similar to grana padano, Bagòss is a salty cheese with traces of natural mold at times.

The village retains its medieval appearance, with abutting historical buildings and winding streets, arcades, squares, fountains, and narrow stairs that go up to the church of St. George.

The frazione Ponte Caffaro lies on the shore of Lake Idro.

Neighbouring communes
 Anfo
 Bienno
 Bondone (Trentino)
 Breno
 Collio
 Condino (TN)
 Idro
 Lavenone
 Prestine
 Storo (TN)

Physical Geography

Territory

Bagolino is placed inside the Caffaro Valley, a tributary valley of the Sabbia Valley.

Twin towns
Bagolino is twinned with:

  Oettingen in Bayern, Germany, since 2000
  Mozac, France, since 2009

Sources

External links

https://web.archive.org/web/20071012214838/http://www.vallesabbia.info/bin/index.php?id=54

Cities and towns in Lombardy